What You See Is What You Get or WYSIWYG is where computer editing software allows content to be edited in a form that resembles its final appearance.

What You See Is What You Get may also refer to:

Music
 What You See Is What You Get (EP), a 1998 EP by Pitchshifter
 What You See Is What You Get (Glen Goldsmith album), 1988
 What You See Is What You Get (Lil' Ed Williams album), 1992
 What You See Is What You Get (Luke Combs album), 2019
 "What You See Is What You Get" (song), a 1971 song by Stoney & Meatloaf
 "What U See Is What U Get", a 1998 song by rapper Xzibit
 "What U See (Is What U Get)", a song by Britney Spears from the 2000 album Oops!... I Did It Again
 "What You See" a 1981 song by Oingo Boingo from the album Only a Lad

Others
 "What you see is what you get", a phrase popularized by Geraldine Jones, a character from the television show The Flip Wilson Show
 What You See Is What You Get (book), a 2010 book written by Alan Sugar

See also
 WYSIWYG (disambiguation)
 Whatcha See Is Whatcha Get (disambiguation)
 "What You Get Is What You See", a song by Tina Turner from her 1987 album Break Every Rule
 Stand by Me (Whatcha See Is Whatcha Get), 1971 album by Pretty Purdie and The Playboys
 What You See Is What You Sweat